Trialism may refer to:

 Trialism (philosophy), a designation for several philosophical concepts
 Trialism (politics), a political doctrine focused on relations between three political subjects:
 Trialism in Austria-Hungary, a political doctrine advocating transformation of the dual Austro-Hungarian Monarchy into a triune state, by creating a third constituent polity  
 Trialism of Dalmatia, Croatia and Slavonia, a political doctrine on relations between historical realms of Dalmatia, Croatia and Slavonia, prominent mostly during the period between 1848 and 1918
 Trialism in the Kingdom of Serbs, Croats and Slovenes (Yugoslavia), a political doctrine advocating transformation of the kingdom into a complex state, with three constituent polities, for Serbs, Croats and Slovenes

See also
 Triallist (disambiguation)
 Trinity (disambiguation)